WNSW (1430 AM) is a religious-formatted broadcast radio station licensed to Newark, New Jersey, serving the New York Metropolitan area. Since 2014, the station has been owned and operated by Starboard Broadcasting's Relevant Radio Roman Catholic radio network. Its transmitters are in Clifton, New Jersey.

History
In 1928, the FCC assigned the 1400 kHz frequency to five radio stations in Brooklyn: WSGH, WSDA, WLTH, WCGU, and WBBC. By 1941, there were only four stations remaining: WCGU was then WARD, WSGH had become WVFW, WBBC and WLTH; these stations merged to become WBYN. WBYN went into operation in 1941 on 1430 kHz; the station was known as "Brooklyn's Own Station".

WNJR
WNJR was a commercial station under the call letters WBYN in Newark, with a transmitter power output (TPO) of 5000 watts. In 1946, The Newark Sunday Call purchased WBYN from the FCC. At the time, The Newark Sunday Call was being purchased by the Newark Evening News. In 1947, the station changed its callsign to WNJR and its ownership to North Jersey Radio. Ahead of its time, it first aired an unsuccessful all-news format. The station diversified its programming, running jazz blocks, R&B music, talk shows, and Latin music. The Newark Evening News owned WNJR until 1953, when Rollins Broadcasting bought the station. As Newark's population became increasingly African-American in the 1960s, WNJR evolved into an R&B music format full-time. Some of the jockeys included Hal Wade, Danny Stiles, Bobby Jay, and Hal Jackson. In 1967, Rollins Broadcasting, after a dispute with its air staff, restructured into Continental Broadcasting. During the 1950s and 1960s the station featured some of the earliest rock and roll programming in the New York area, including the first claim to airing Alan Freed in that region. Despite claiming to be based in Newark, from the late 1950s through the 1970s the station broadcast from a studio in Union. The station's two  guyed broadcast towers were well known to residents of the newly developed College Estates section of Union. WNJR suffered from poor nighttime signal coverage due to its FCC-mandated directional antenna signal pattern. Additionally the station's antenna system's capacity hat design radiated too much signal skyward and not enough toward the ground where listeners reside. This caused signal cancellation and fading. Co-channel interference also limited its nighttime coverage ..

As Newark (its home city) became predominantly African-American during the 1970s, WNJR switched to a black-oriented music and news format. In 1973, it became the flagship station of Unity Broadcasting's National Black Network (NBN).

City of Newark/urban era
In 1968 The FCC refused to renew Continental Broadcasting's license but pending an appeal they still continued to run WNJR, which was profitable. The soul format continued as well. In July 1971 Continental Broadcasting's license was officially revoked and the station was forced off the air on the July 21. The FCC though allowed the city of Newark to run the station, and it signed back on a week later.

Financial problems
WNJR continued with an urban contemporary format and became the flagship station of Unity Broadcasting's National Black Network (now Sheridan Broadcasting's American Urban Radio Networks) in 1973. WNJR evolved into more of an urban adult contemporary (AC) format by 1978. Also, the station played gospel music and sermons on Sunday mornings and evenings. In 1982, Sound Radio received the WNJR license. The format stayed much the same. Initially the station was profitable, but by 1988 it began to lose money as its core audience switched to New York City's two FM urban powerhouses, WBLS and WRKS (98.7 Kiss FM). In 1989, Sound Radio filed Chapter 7 bankruptcy.

Brokered days
In 1991 American Radio Associates bought the station and attempted to keep the urban AC format, but they too had financial problems and sold the station to Douglas Broadcasting in 1992. At that point the station dropped its urban AC format in favor of gospel music mornings and late afternoons, ethnic brokered shows mid-days and nights, and gospel music and teaching on Sundays.

In 1995, Multicultural Broadcasting bought 1430 WNJR and shifted the station to include more Asian shows. They kept some gospel music programming on Sundays. The station was then profitable.

Sunny 1430 era
After WQEW in New York City became Radio Disney in late 1998, WNJR began playing adult standards. Julius LaRosa was the morning host, while Johnny Michaels hosted during the afternoon. In March 1999, Multicultural decided to fill the hole and put a standards format on 1430. WNJR changed its callsign to WNSW June 8, 1999. The station became known as Sunny 1430. They originally planned to switch to this format full-time except for Sunday mornings, but initially would run this format from 6 a.m. to 7 p.m. weekdays and 10 a.m. to midnight Saturdays and not at all on Sundays. The rest of the time they ran ethnic programming that was brokered. On Sundays they played gospel music and preaching.

During the week though they played a standards format with artists like Frank Sinatra and Neil Diamond. The format was similar to 1560 WQEW's old format. They mixed in baby boomer pop in moderation. Still they focused on the standards. Some of the airpeople included Johnny Knox (who was program director and operations manager the first year of operation), John Von Soosten, Chuck Leonard, Danny Stiles, Julius LaRosa, among others.

Standards' demise
It was decided that once advertising grew enough to support standards that they would drop the weekend brokered shows that were still the main source of revenue for WNSW. This never happened. The station was unable to sell even a moderate amount of commercial time but held on to the format during daytime in the week and Saturdays. Brokered shows were the only source of substantial income for WNSW, but it was not enough to keep the station profitable. In 2000 the station moved toward a Big Band focus and dropped the Neil Diamond and Elvis cuts.

Finally on February 28, 2001, WNSW dropped the format altogether with the playing of Frank Sinatra's Softly, as I Leave You. The format, however, continued with a few evening hours with Danny Stiles. The rest of the day reverted to brokered programming.

Voice of Russia
In January 2011, WNSW converted to a 24-hour simulcast of the English language service of the Voice of Russia and maintained this format until April 2014, when owner Multicultural Broadcasting sold the station.

Relevant Radio
In April 2014, the station was sold to Starboard Broadcasting for $10 million and switched to religious Catholic programming with the branding of Relevant Radio.

Power increase proposed
In early 2007, WNSW applied to move their transmitter from Hillside, New Jersey to Clifton, New Jersey. The station also has applied for a power increase of 5,000 watts day and night to 10,000 watts day and 7,000 watts night, which would allow their signal to be heard throughout New York City.

In 2008, the Hillside Township towers were dismantled. WNSW now transmits from the four towers leased from WPAT (AM) in Clifton.

References

External links

NYC radio guide 
Pirate Jim radio History
WNJR anecdotal history
- Veteran AM 1430 WNJR radio DJ, Randy Parker on the air @ WNJR-RADIO.COM
1950s WNJR poster

NSW
Catholic radio stations
Radio stations established in 1947
1947 establishments in New Jersey
Relevant Radio stations